Lukáš Sáblík (born August 5, 1976 in Jihlava) is a Czech professional ice hockey goaltender currently playing with HC Dukla Jihlava of the 1. národní hokejová liga (Czech.1). He previously played with HC Karlovy Vary in the Czech Extraliga during the 2010–11 Czech Extraliga season.

References

External links

1976 births
Motor České Budějovice players
Czech ice hockey goaltenders
HC Karlovy Vary players
Living people
Orli Znojmo players
Sportspeople from Jihlava
PSG Berani Zlín players
HC Dukla Jihlava players
HKM Zvolen players
HC Slovan Ústečtí Lvi players
Czech expatriate ice hockey players in Slovakia